Tisinger is a surname. Notable people with the surname include:

Debbie Tisinger-Moore (born 1958), American racquetball player
Janel Tisinger (born 1983), American racquetball player

See also
Tysinger